Suazo may refer to:

People
 Alicia Suazo (born ????), member of the Utah State Senate from 2001 to 2002
 Anita Louise Suazo (born 1937), Native American potter from Santa Clara Pueblo, New Mexico state
 Chloe Suazo (born 1991), American actress
 David Suazo (born 1979), retired Honduran footballer who played as a striker
 Humberto Suazo (born 1981), Chilean footballer who plays as a striker
 Jonathan Suazo (born 1989), Chilean footballer who plays as a full-back
 Jose Peña Suazo (born 1967), Latin singer focusing on the Latin subgenre merengue
 Juan Pablo Suazo Euceda (born 1972), Honduran author and agricultural engineer
 Juanita Suazo Dubray (born 1930), Native American potter from Taos Pueblo, New Mexico state
 Julio César Suazo (born 1978), retired Honduran footballer who played as a defender
 Leonel Suazo (born ????), retired Honduran footballer who played as a forward
 Lucy Suazo (born 1981), Dominican female volleyball player
 Maynor Suazo (born 1979), Honduran footballer who plays as an attacking midfielder
 Milton Palacios Suazo (born 1980), retired Honduran footballer who played as a centre-back
 Nicolás Suazo (born 1965), retired Honduran footballer who played as a forward
 Pete Suazo (????–2001), the first Hispanic Utah State Senator
 Roberto Suazo Córdova (1927-2018), former President of Honduras

Others
 Suazo (surname), Spanish-origin surname
 Estadio Roberto Suazo Cordoba, multi-use stadium in La Paz, Honduras

See also
 Zuazo (disambiguation)

Disambiguation pages with surname-holder lists